Ashley Gorrell is an American actress known for her role as Jessica Whitaker in Thunder in Paradise.

Filmography

Film
Thunder in Paradise II (1994, as Jessica Whitaker)
Thunder in Paradise 3 (1995, as Jessica Whitaker)
I'll Be Home for Christmas (1997, as Jilly)
Mail to the Chief (2000, as Heather Boyd)
Bad Blood (2006, as Jess)
Bad Blood... the Hunger (2012, as Jess)

Television
Thunder in Paradise (1994, 18 episodes, as Jessica Whitaker)
Baywatch (1994 - 1996, 5 episodes, as Joey Jennings)
Second Noah (1996-1997, 22 episodes, as Hannah) 
One Tree Hill (2005, 1 episode, as Catty Girl #3)

Video game
Thunder in Paradise Interactive (1995, as Jessica Whitaker)

See also

References

External links
 

Living people
20th-century American actresses
21st-century American actresses
Year of birth missing (living people)
Place of birth missing (living people)
Nationality missing
American film actresses
American television actresses
American video game actresses
Actresses from Florida
People from Sarasota, Florida